GANYC (Guides Association of New York City) is the professional association of licensed New York City tour guides.

Established in 1974, it is one of the oldest tour guide associations in the United States. GANYC is a member of the World Federation of Tourist Guide Associations. With a present count of approximately 341 members, GANYC represents nearly 10% of the guides licensed in New York City with an estimated 4,000 guides currently licensed by the Department of Consumer and Worker Protection.

The organization's mission is provide continuing education about touring through a series of internal and external programs. It also advocates on behalf of New York tourism industry workers, such as in response to overtourism concerns at the Statue of Liberty in 2019 or after tourism shutdowns during the COVID-19 pandemic. They have also worked with city agencies on behalf of better conditions for tourists, including an ongoing legislative battle involving sightseeing bus guides. It has also acted as an aid in finding government assistance for its constituents, such as after the September 11th attacks in 2001.

The organization is run by an all-volunteer Executive Board, with elections occurring among its membership every two years. GANYC's current president is Emma Guest-Consales.

History
GANYC was founded as the Multilingual Guides Association of New York City in 1974. In 1979, the organization changed its name to the Guides Association of New York City to better reflect its growing recognition outside of New York as the professional organization for tour guides in New York City. In 2012, GANYC began to hold its monthly meetings at various sites of historic and cultural significance and also introduced industry partner membership and strategic affiliations to more closely engage with businesses and organizations interested in supported tour guiding. Its membership provides tours in all five NYC boroughs and covers approximately 10% of all New York City sightseeing guide licensees.

GANYC Apple Awards
GANYC hosts an annual awards ceremony to honor the best in New York City culture, preservation and tourism in a dozen categories.

Previous hosts have included Tony award-winning broadway musical star Brian Stokes Mitchell, cabaret performer Mark Nadler, and podcast hosts the Bowery Boys.

References

External links
 

Professional associations based in the United States
Organizations established in 1974
1974 establishments in the United States
Organizations based in New York City
Travel-related organizations
Tourism in New York City